At , Cameroon is the world's 53rd largest country. It is slightly larger than the nation of Sweden and the US state of California. It is comparable in size to Papua New Guinea.

The country is located in Central and West Africa, bordering the Bight of Biafra, between Equatorial Guinea and Nigeria.

Cameroon is sometimes described as "Africa in miniature" because it exhibits all the major climates and vegetation of the continent: mountains, desert, rain forest, savanna grassland, and ocean coastland. Cameroon can be divided into five geographic zones. These are distinguished by dominant physical, climatic, and vegetative features.

Natural regions

In the former western state, however, the mass of Mount Cameroon reaches almost to the sea. The plain is densely forested including areas of Central African mangroves especially around Douala and in the estuary of the Cross River on the border with Nigeria.

A recent global remote sensing analysis suggested that there were 643km² of tidal flats in Cameroon, making it the 39th ranked country in terms of tidal flat area.

It is less humid than the coast.

In western Cameroon is an irregular chain of mountains, hills, and plateaus that extends from Mount Cameroon almost to Lake Chad at the northern tip of the country. This region includes the Bamenda, Bamiléké, and Mambilla highlands. It also contains some of the country's most fertile soils, notably around volcanic Mt. Cameroon. This area of tropical forest has been categorised by the World Wildlife Fund as the Cameroonian Highlands forests ecoregion with Mount Cameroon considered separately because as an active volcano it has a distinct environment from the other mountains.

From the forested southern plateau the land rises northward to the grassy, rugged Adamaoua (Adamawa) highlands. Stretching across Cameroon from the western mountain area, the Adamaoua forms a barrier between the north and south.

The southern savanna plain extends from the edge of the Adamaoua to Lake Chad. Its characteristic vegetation is scrub and grass. This is region of sparse rainfall and high median temperatures has been included as part of the East Sudanian savanna ecoregion.

Climate 
 
The climate varies with terrain, from tropical along the coast to semiarid and hot in the north.
Exceedingly hot and humid, the coastal belt includes some of the wettest places on earth.

Biodiversity

The wide diversity of climates and natural regions of Cameroon, as coastline, mountains, savanna, deserts, and tropical forests, allows that the country counts with rich biodiversity. Twenty-two million hectares from the Congo Basin forest ecosystem are located in Cameroon, where 9,000 plant species, 900 bird species, and 320 mammals species live, included 156 endemic plants, eight endemic birds, and 14 endemic mammals. The border with Nigeria has one of the highest concentration of biodiversity in Africa.

As part of the conservation efforts to protect threatened natural resources, Cameroon has established protected areas since 1932, included national parks, wildlife sanctuaries, faunal reserves, and one flora sanctuary.

Cameroon had a 2018 Forest Landscape Integrity Index mean score of 8.00/10, ranking it 29th globally out of 172 countries.

Rivers

The country has four patterns of drainage. In the south, the principal rivers flow southwestward or westward directly to the Gulf of Guinea – the Wouri, and lesser Dibamba, Bimbia and Mungo to the Cameroon estuary near Douala; Sanaga, Nyong, and Ntem further south along the coast; Akwayafe and Manyu (which joins Nigerian Cross), and the lesser Ndian and Meme north of the coast. The Dja and Kadeï, however, drain southeastward into the Congo River. In northern Cameroon, the Benoué River (Benue) runs north and west, eventually into the Niger, while the Logone River flows northward into Lake Chad.

Some of the borders of Cameron follow rivers, including the Aïna, Akwayafe, and Ntem or Campo.

Data
Location:
Central Africa, bordering the Bight of Biafra, between Equatorial Guinea and Nigeria

Geographic coordinates:

Continent:
Africa

Area:
total:

land:

water:

Area – comparative:
slightly larger than Sweden

Land boundaries:
total:
5,018 km
border countries:
Central African Republic 901 km, Chad 1,116 km, Republic of the Congo 494 km, Equatorial Guinea 183 km, Gabon 349 km, Nigeria 1,975 km

Coastline:
402 km

Maritime claims:
territorial sea:

Terrain:
diverse, with coastal plain in southwest, dissected plateau in center, mountains in west, plains in north

Elevation extremes:
lowest point:
Atlantic Ocean 0 m
highest point:
Fako (on. Mt. Cameroon) 4,095 m

Natural resources:
petroleum, bauxite, iron ore, timber, hydropower

Land use:
arable land:
13.12%
permanent crops:
3.28%
other:
83.61% (2012)

Irrigated land:
256.5 km2 (2003)

Total renewable water resources:
285.5 km3 (2011)

Freshwater withdrawal (domestic/industrial/agricultural):
total:
0.97 km3/yr (23%/10%/68%)
per capita:
58.9 m3/yr (2005)

Natural hazards:
Recent limnic eruptions with release of carbon dioxide:
from Lake Monoun, 15 August 1984, killing 37
from Lake Nyos, 21 August 1986, killing as many as 1,800

Environment – current issues:
water-borne diseases are prevalent; deforestation; overgrazing; desertification; poaching; overfishing

Environment – international agreements:
party to:
Biodiversity, Climate Change, Desertification, Endangered Species, Hazardous Wastes, Law of the Sea, Ozone Layer Protection, Tropical Timber 83, Tropical Timber 94, Wetlands, Whaling
signed, but not ratified:
Nuclear Test Ban

Geography – note:
sometimes referred to as 'the hinge of Africa;' throughout the country there are areas of thermal springs and indications of current or prior volcanic activity; Mount Cameroon, the highest mountain in Sub-Saharan west Africa, is an active volcano

Extreme points 

This is a list of the extreme points of Cameroon, the points that are farther north, south, east or west than any other location.

 Northernmost point – unnamed peninsula jutting into Lake Chad, Far North Region
 Easternmost point – unnamed location on the border with the Republic of Congo in the Sangha River opposite the Congolese town of Bomassa, East Region
 Southernmost point – unnamed headland at the confluence on the Sangha River and the Ngoko River immediately north of the Congolese town of Ouesso, East Region
 Westernmost point – unnamed point on Akwabana Island, Southwest Region

Gallery

See also

Cameroon
Geology of Cameroon
List of volcanoes in Cameroon

Notes

References